Ragnar Søderlind (born 27 June 1945) is a Norwegian composer. He has written ballets and operas, and for the concert hall, programmatic works based on poems.

Biography
Ragnar studied with Conrad Baden in Oslo and with Erik Bergman and Joonas Kokkonen at the Sibelius Academy in Helsinki. This was followed by studies in conducting at the Norwegian State Academy of Music where he is currently a faculty member.

As a composer, Søderlind initially composed orchestral works which were strongly influenced by late Romanticism and early 20th-century European music. His style has become more advanced over the years, yet throughout he has been a master of orchestration and has maintained his personal stamp on sound. In addition to orchestral music, his output includes incidental music for plays, ballets and operas. He has also arranged a considerable amount of music, including several works by Edvard Grieg, and he has recently written an opera that includes Grieg’s music for Olav Tryggvason.

Discography
Søderlind's Violin Concerto has been recorded together with Johan Kvandal's on the Centaur label.
Symphonies Nos. 2 & 3, "Rokkomborre", London Symphony Orchestra, Ragnar Söderlind conductor, Aurora label (1989).

Works 
1962/63:“Jolsterslatt” for orchestra, op.2: 3 minutes
1964-65:“Preludium” for orchestra, op.4: 9 minutes
1965/77:“Pieta” for male voice and string orchestra, op.5: 6 minutes
1967:   “Fra Nord til Sor” for symphonic band, op.7B: 3 minutes
             “Rokkomborre” for orchestra, op.8: 7 minutes   + (Aurora cd)
1967-70:Symphonic Vision “Polaris” for orchestra, op.11: 14 minutes          +  (Aurora cd)
1968:   Trauermusik for orchestra, op.12: 9 minutes    +  (Aurora cd)
1969:   “Fantasia Borealis” for orchestra, op.14: 11 minutes
1971:   Sinfonia minimale for youth orchestra, op.16: 4 minutes
1971-72:International Rhapsody for orchestra or small orchestra, op.17: 10 minutes
1973/75:“Two Pieces from the Desert” for Oboe and Small Orchestra, op. 21B: 11 minutes
1974:   “Fra myggenes land” for symphonic band, op.18
1975/79:Symphony No.1, op.23: 27 minutes
1977/80:Cantata “Vaer utamodig, menneske” for chorus and orchestra, op. 25: 10 minutes
1978:   Symphonic/Choreographic Drama “Hedda Gabler” for orchestra, op.26: 30 minutes
             “Dagsalme” for symphonic band and organ, op.28, No.2
1979:   Symphonic Poem “Amor et labor”, op. 27: 10 minutes
1981:   Symphony No.2 “Sinfonia Breve”, op.30: 14 minutes   +  (Aurora cd)
1981/88:Sinfonietta for brass and percussion, op. 31 A: 15 minutes
1982:   Ballet “Kristin Lavransdatter”, op.32: 45 minutes
             Symphonic Poem “Kom havsindar, kom!, op.33: 5 minutes
1982-83:“Eg hev funne min floysne lokkar att I mitt svarmerus” for soprano and orchestra, op.35C: 10 minutes
1982-95:Symphonic Poem “Krans og kors”, op.64: 45 minutes
1983:   Olavs Hymne” for male voice, chorus and orchestra, op. 36: 13 minutes
             “Septemberlys” for male voice and orchestra, op.37: 15 minutes
             Two Songs for male voice and orchestra, op.39B: 5 minutes
1984:   Symphony No.3 “Les illuminations symphoniques” for soprano, baritone and orchestra, op.40: 35 minutes    + (Aurora cd)
             “Toccata brillante over ‘Seier’n er var’ for orchestra, op.41: 4 minutes
             “Nasadiya/Upphavshymna”, op.42 for chorus and ensemble: 10 minutes
             Nostalgic Rhapsody “Eystradalir” for orchestra, op. 43: 12 minutes
1985:   Symphonic Poem “Av hav er du komen” for four narrators, violin, women’s chorus and orchestra, op.44: 45 minutes
1985-86:Ballet Music “Victoria”, op. 45 (and Ballet Suite, op.45B: 15 minutes)
1986-87:   Violin Concerto, op. 46: 34 minutes   + (Centaur cd)
1988:   Ecstasy for strings and timpani, op.45C: 6 minutes
1989:   Passion Cantata for two voices, chorus and orchestra, op. 48
1990:   Tone Poem “The Hour of Love”, op.45D
1990/95:Symphony No.4 “Sedimenti musicalii”, op.50: 30 minutes   + (Aurora cd)
1991:   “Transtromer”: Suite for voice, piano, two percussion and string orchestra or chamber orchestra, op.52 B and C: 25 minutes
1991-92:Cello Concerto, op.54: 36 minutes    +  (Aurora cd)
1992:   Two Songs from texts by Hans Borli for low voice and orchestra, op. 55B: 5 minutes
             “Haugebonden”-Ten Ironic Variations on a Norwegian folk-tune for chamber orchestra, op.56: 10 minutes
1993/97:Symphonic Poem “Der Tanz des Lebens” for tenor and orchestra, op.67: 25 minutes
1994/95:Cantata “Bak morke vinter ventar ein var” for six solo voices, chorus and orchestra, op. 61: 25 minutes
             “De beste” for voice and small orchestra, op.62C: 2 minutes
1995:   Fanfare Regale for orchestra, op.63: 1 minute
1995/2001:Symphony No.5 “Kvitsunn”, op.60: 28 minutes    *
             Symphonic Suite “Angst”, op.68: 20 minutes
1996-97:Piano Concerto “Colosso”, op.70: 38 minutes
1997:   Cantata “Rogden Sjo” for soprano, chorus and orchestra, op.72A
1998-99: Symphony No.6 “Todesahnung”, op.74: 45 minutes
1999:   “Arle I old: Tanker ved et tidsskille” for lur, ram’s horn and orchestra, op.75: 7 minutes
             “The Hollow Men: A Penny for the Old Guy” (A Little Requiem for the 20th century) for male chorus and chamber orchestra, op.76:12 minutes
2001-02:Trumpet Concerto “Die Signale des Tods und des Lebens”, op. 80: 28 minutes
2001:   “Rapsodia del teatro” for mezzo-soprano, cello and string orchestra, op. 82: 12 minutes
2002:   Symphony No.7 “La Campane dell’Atlantico” for baritone, chorus and orchestra, op.85 B: 33 minutes
2002-03:Viola Concerto “Nostalgia delle radici”, op. 86: 40 minutes
2003:   “Mother Bear” for chorus, harp, piano, timpani,  two percussion and string orchestra, op. 87B
2004:   “Sona-Torrek”-Melodrama for narrator men’s choir and orchestra, op.90
2004-05:Symphony No.8 “Jean Sibelius in memoriam”, op.95: 23 minutes
2005:   Symphonic  Incantations “The Great Mother Bear” for orchestra, op.92:20 minutes
2009:   “A Nordic Requiem: a Mass for the Living and the Dead” for seven, soloists, chorus and orchestra, op.104: 120 minutes

Sources
 Arvid O. Vollsnes. The New Grove Dictionary of Opera, edited by Stanley Sadie (1992),   and 
 Colin Mackie's Website: Composer Catalogues

1945 births
Living people
Norwegian classical composers
Norwegian opera composers
Norwegian male classical composers